Kelvin Anom also known as Bra Kevin Beats in the entertainment space, is a Ghanaian rapper and known for the song Three Headed Beats and Riddle Riddle.

Career
He was part of the Skillion group which was co-founded Jayso and T-Kube.The consisted of Joey B, Lil Shaker.

Discography
Wedding
Nana Nyame
Sit Up
Pablo
Mama Pray
Three Headed Beast
Riddle Riddle

Awards
He won two awards at the 4syte music awards in 2011
He was nominated twice for the 2012 Vodafone Ghana Music Awards

References

Living people
Ghanaian musicians
Year of birth missing (living people)